Patrick Jordan Sandoval (born October 18, 1996) is an American professional baseball pitcher for the Los Angeles Angels of Major League Baseball (MLB).

Sandoval was born and raised in the Orange County city of Mission Viejo, California. He attended Mission Viejo High School, where he was a multi-sport athlete and became a notable baseball prospect with selections to all-county and all-league teams. Initially committed to play college baseball for Vanderbilt University and later for the University of Southern California, Sandoval forewent college when he was drafted by the Houston Astros in the 11th round of the 2015 MLB draft.

After spending multiple seasons in the Astros farm system, Sandoval was traded to the Los Angeles Angels for Martín Maldonado in 2018. He made his major league debut in 2019 and spent his first two brief seasons alternating between the starting rotation and the bullpen. Sandoval began 2021 as a reliever but was moved into the starting rotation shortly thereafter. On August 19, 2022, he threw a shutout at Comerica Park on 97 pitches, becoming the first Angels player in six seasons to throw a Maddux.

Early life
Patrick Sandoval was born on October 18, 1996, in Mission Viejo, California to Jorge, originally from Mexico City, and Robin. He grew up attending Angels games at Angel Stadium and his favorite player was then-Cardinals first baseman and eventual Angels teammate Albert Pujols, doing a book report on his biography in the third grade and emulating his batting stance in Little League. When he was 8 years old, Sandoval was a member of an Angels-themed Little League team and tried pitching for the first time that year.

Sandoval attended Mission Viejo High School, where he played baseball and football as a punter. In 2013, his sophomore season, Sandoval posted a 7–5 record and a 2.58 earned run average (ERA).

As a junior, the Orange County Register named Sandoval as a top player in the county to watch during the 2014 season, alongside eventual major leaguers such as Griffin Canning and Kolby Allard. He gained further media attention on April 30 for throwing a two-hit shutout against Capistrano Valley High School to aid Mission Viejo in its CIF Southern Section (CIF-SS) playoff hunt and improve his season stats to a 6–2 record with a 2.38 ERA. He threw another shutout on May 13, blanking Trabuco Hills High School and receiving praise from his coach for inducing an increased amount of whiffs. At the conclusion of the season, the Register named Sandoval to its All-County second team and he was also selected to the All-CIF-SS first team. On August 10, Sandoval partook in the Perfect Game All-American Classic at Petco Park in San Diego, pitching  of an inning and recording a strikeout.

In November 2014, his senior year in high school, Sandoval signed his National Letter of Intent to play college baseball for Vanderbilt University. On March 31, 2015, Sandoval threw a two-hit shutout against top-ranked San Clemente High School. On May 11, he switched his collegiate commitment from Vanderbilt to the University of Southern California (USC). Sandoval finished his senior season at 9–3 with a 0.97 ERA. On June 6, Sandoval threw a complete game while giving up two hits and one unearned run to aid Mission Viejo in its 3–1 victory over Chino Hills High School in the CIF-SS Division 2 championship game. Following the season, he was selected to the Register's All-County first team and was named the CIF-SS Division 2 Most Valuable Player.

Professional career

Houston Astros organization
The Houston Astros selected Sandoval in the 11th round, with the 319th overall pick, of the 2015 Major League Baseball draft. Sandoval initially signaled intent to eschew his draft selection and attend USC, but he ultimately signed with the Astros after they offered him a $900,000 bonus; at $800,000 over-slot, it was the largest bonus given to a player picked beyond the first 10 rounds of the 2015 draft. Astros scouting director Mike Elias called Sandoval a "premium" prospect and noted that his scouting department had been closely following his development throughout the spring.

After signing, Sandoval made his professional debut that season in the Rookie-level Gulf Coast League (GCL) with the GCL Astros. In his first professional game on August 1, 2015, he pitched two innings while giving up eight hits and five runs (four earned) and striking out three against the GCL Phillies. He finished his first professional season at 0–3 with a 6.08 ERA in six starts. On June 22, 2016, the Astros assigned Sandoval to the Rookie-level Greeneville Astros of the Appalachian League, where he pitched to a 2–3 record and 5.30 ERA in 13 games (eight starts).

On May 14, 2017, Sandoval was promoted to the Class A-Advanced Buies Creek Astros of the Carolina League. In one start with Buies Creek, he surrendered three earned runs across  innings for a 10.13 ERA. On June 19, Sandoval was demoted to the Class A Short Season Tri-City ValleyCats of the New York–Penn League. In four starts with Tri-City, Sandoval went 1–1 with a 3.79 ERA across 19 innings. On July 11, he was promoted to the Single A Quad Cities River Bandits of the Midwest League. Quad Cities primarily used Sandoval as a starter but intermittently used him out of the bullpen. In nine appearances (seven starts), he compiled a 2–2 record with a 3.83 ERA with 48 strikeouts across 40 innings. Between the three teams, Sandoval had a 3–4 record and 4.09 ERA in 14 games (11 starts) and 78 strikeouts. In Game 2 of the 2017 Midwest League Championship Series, Sandoval pitched six scoreless innings to aid the team in its 5–0 victory en route to a sweep of the Fort Wayne TinCaps to win the Midwest League championship.

Sandoval began the 2018 season with Quad Cities and compiled a 7–1 record in 14 games (10 starts) with a 2.49 ERA, 71 strikeouts, and a save across 65 innings. He was named the starting pitcher for the Midwest League All-Star Game. He pitched one inning in the exhibition while giving up two hits and one run. On June 27, Sandoval was promoted to the Buies Creek Astros. He compiled a 33-inning scoreless streak between the two teams spanning from June 3 to July 11. In five games (three starts) with Buies Creek, Sandoval went 2–0 with a 2.74 ERA, 26 strikeouts, and a save in 23 innings.

Los Angeles Angels

2018–2019: Minor leagues
On July 26, 2018, the Astros traded Sandoval and international pool space cash to the Los Angeles Angels in exchange for catcher Martín Maldonado. He was assigned to the Class A-Advanced Inland Empire 66ers of the California League the same day. In three starts with Inland Empire, Sandoval went 1–0 with no runs given up and 21 strikeouts in  innings. On August 16, he was promoted to the Double-A Mobile BayBears of the Southern League. in four starts with Mobile, Sandoval posted a 1–0 record with 1.37 ERA and 27 strikeouts in 19.2 innings. In 26 games (20 starts) between Quad Cities, Buies Creek, Inland Empire, and Mobile, he was 11–1 with a 2.06 ERA, striking out 145 batters in  innings pitched.

Sandoval began the 2019 season with Mobile. On April 14, he set a career-high in strikeouts with 11 in a game against the Mississippi Braves. In five games (four starts) with Mobile, Sandoval posted an 0–3 record with a 3.60 ERA and 32 strikeouts in 20 innings. On May 4, he was promoted to the Triple-A Salt Lake Bees of the Pacific Coast League. In 15 starts with Salt Lake, Sandoval went 4–4 with a 6.41 ERA and 66 strikeouts in  innings. He finished his five-year minor league stint with a 20–18 record, 4.01 ERA, 383 strikeouts, and  innings pitched in 79 games (64 starts).

2019–present: Major leagues

On August 5, 2019, the Angels selected Sandoval's contract and promoted him to the major leagues. He made his major league debut that night versus the Cincinnati Reds, pitching five innings behind opener Taylor Cole while allowing two runs and striking out eight. The first major league batter Sandoval faced was Jesse Winker, who he proceeded to walk. He recorded his first out against Joey Votto and his first strikeout against Eugenio Suárez. The first hit he gave up was a single hit by Tucker Barnhart. Sandoval finished the 2019 season with a 0–4 record and a 5.03 ERA over ten appearances (nine starts), striking out 42 batters in  innings.

In 2020, Sandoval began the COVID-19-shortened season as the fifth member of the team's starting rotation. He made his first start of the year on July 28 against the Seattle Mariners, pitching four innings while giving up an earned run and striking out four. Sandoval struggled in his next four starts, going 0–4 with a 7.71 ERA in  innings. On August 28, Sandoval was optioned to the Angels' alternate training site that was being used in place of the cancelled 2020 minor league season. On September 16, the Angels recalled Sandoval to use him out of the bullpen. In three appearances as a long reliever, he posted a 3.18 ERA with 15 strikeouts through  innings. On September 23, Sandoval was credited with his first career win after throwing three shutout innings against the San Diego Padres at Petco Park. Sandoval received another start on the final day of the season, throwing  innings against the Los Angeles Dodgers while giving up two runs and striking out three. Sandoval finished the 2020 season at 1–5 with a 5.65 ERA, 33 strikeouts, and  innings over nine games (six starts).

Sandoval began the 2021 season as a reliever but was added to the starting rotation in late May when José Quintana was placed on the injured list. On July 14, 2021, in a start against the Minnesota Twins at Target Field, Sandoval carried a no-hit bid into the ninth inning before giving up a double to Brent Rooker with one out. Angels manager Joe Maddon then pulled Sandoval from the game for closer Raisel Iglesias, who allowed Sandoval's baserunner to score before securing the 2–1 win. Sandoval finished the game with  innings pitched, a hit, an earned run, a walk, and 13 strikeouts. On August 27, Sandoval was placed on the 60-day injured list due to a lower back stress fracture, officially ending his season. Angels general manager Perry Minasian praised Sandoval's season, calling it an "outstanding year" and "something to build off of". Over 14 starts prior to the injury, he went 3–6 with a 3.62 ERA with 94 strikeouts in 87 innings. His 2.0 Wins Above Replacement (WAR) was fourth-most among all Angels players and second-most among Angels starting pitchers, only behind American League MVP Shohei Ohtani.

Sandoval began the 2022 season as a member of the Angels' starting rotation. He was originally slated to be second in the rotation and make his first start of the year against the Astros on April 8, but he was scratched due to fatigue. He made his season debut on April 12, pitching four innings against the Miami Marlins while not giving up any earned runs but dealing with pitch command issues. Sandoval did not allow an earned run through his first three starts of the season. On August 19, 2022, in a game against the Detroit Tigers at Comerica Park, Sandoval threw the first ever shutout of his career, allowing four hits and no walks with nine strikeouts. He accomplished the feat with 97 pitches, making it the first Maddux for the Angels since Ricky Nolasco did so in 2016 and the first in MLB since Ranger Suárez on September 25, 2021. In 27 starts in 2022, Sandoval went 6–9 with a 2.91 ERA and 151 strikeouts across  innings.

On January 13, 2023, Sandoval signed a one-year, $2.75 million contract with the Angels, avoiding salary arbitration.

International career
In December 2022, it was announced that Sandoval would pitch for the Mexico national baseball team, managed by Angels first base coach Benji Gil, in the 2023 World Baseball Classic. He joined fellow Angels pitcher Gerardo Reyes on the Mexico roster. During a game against the United States national baseball team on March 12, Sandoval started and pitched three innings while giving up two hits, a run, and striking out two. He struck out Angels teammate Mike Trout and was credited with the win.

Pitching style
Sandoval is a 6 ft 3 in, 190 lb (1.90 m, 86 kg) pitcher that utilizes a diverse pitch repertoire. He primarily relies on the four-seam fastball, slider, and changeup while occasionally using the curveball and sinker pitches. Sandoval threw his 93 mile per hour (150 km/h) fastball nearly half the time in his first two major league seasons but decreased its usage in 2021, a change that was accompanied by an improved ERA.

Sandoval's pitches are not frequently hard-hit by batters.

Sandoval occasionally struggles with pitch command, thus allowing walks and preventing him from pitching deep into games without exceeding a typical pitch count limit.

References

External links

1996 births
Living people
Baseball players from California
Buies Creek Astros players
Greeneville Astros players
Gulf Coast Astros players
Inland Empire 66ers of San Bernardino players
Los Angeles Angels players
Major League Baseball pitchers
Mobile BayBears players
Quad Cities River Bandits players
Salt Lake Bees players
Sportspeople from Mission Viejo, California
Tri-City ValleyCats players
Mission Viejo High School alumni
American baseball players of Mexican descent
2023 World Baseball Classic players